Leiopython biakensis, the Biak white-lipped python,  is a species of snake in the family Pythonidae. It is endemic to the island of Biak, which lies north of New Guinea.

The species is known from a few individuals collected on the southern part of the island. Little is known about its population or habitat.

Taxonomy
Some authorities consider it a population of the Northern white-lipped python (Leiopython albertisii).

References

Pythonidae
Snakes of New Guinea
Endemic fauna of the Biak–Numfoor rain forests
\Fauna of Western New Guinea
Reptiles described in 2008